Service Request Transport Protocol (GE-SRTP) protocol is developed by GE Intelligent Platforms (earlier GE Fanuc) for transfer of data from programmable logic controllers. The protocol is used over Ethernet almost all GE automation equipment supports the GE-SRTP protocol when equipped with an Ethernet port. Any SRTP client will be capable of reading and writing system memory of any number of remote SRTP capable devices.

See also

Computer network
Computer science

External links

Industrial computing
Industrial Ethernet